Euclasta is a genus of moths of the family Crambidae.

Species

References

Pyraustinae
Crambidae genera
Taxa named by Julius Lederer